The KTFF Super Cup, formerly known as Cumhurbaşkanlığı Kupası ("Presidential Cup"), was the super cup tournament of the Cyprus Turkish Football Federation, Turkish Republic of Northern Cyprus. It was created in 1981.

It was contested between the winners of KTFF Süper Lig and the Cypriot Cup before the beginning of a season.

KTFF Super Cup Winners
List of finals:
1981 : Gençlik Gücü 5-4 Gönyeli
1982 : Türk Ocagi 1-0 Magusa Türk Gücü
1983 : Magusa Türk Gücü
1984 : Türk Ocagi 3-1 Yenicami Ağdelen
1985 : Gönyeli  5-1 Küçük Kaymakli
1986 : Magusa Türk Gücü 2-1 Küçük Kaymakli
1987 : Baf Ülkü Yurdu  2-0 Magusa Türk Gücü
1988 : Baf Ülkü Yurdu 1-0 Küçük Kaymakli
1989 : Baf Ülkü Yurdu 2-1 Yenicami Ağdelen
1990 : Türk Ocagi              1-0 Baf Ülkü Yurdu
1991 : Çetinkaya Türk 7-5 Dogan Türk Birligi   [after pen]
1992 : Çetinkaya Türk 3-2 Dogan Türk Birligi
1993 : Çetinkaya Türk 2-1 Gönyeli             [after pen]
1994 : Yalova                  6-5 Dogan Türk Birligi   [after pen]
1995 : Gönyeli                 2-0 Yalova
1996 : Çetinkaya Türk 6-1 Akincilar
1997 : Küçük Kaymakli 1-0 Çetinkaya Türk
1998 : Çetinkaya Türk 3-2 Gönyeli
1999 : Gönyeli                 6-3 Çetinkaya Türk
2000 : Gönyeli                 3-2 Çetinkaya Türk
2001 : Çetinkaya Türk 4-0 Gönyeli
2006 : Çetinkaya Türk 1-1 Magusa Türk Gücü     [6-5 pen] [in London]
2011 : Çetinkaya Türk 2-1 Küçük Kaymakli2012 : Çetinkaya Türk 4-2 Dogan Türk Birligi
2013: Yenicami Ağdelen 6-4 Çetinkaya Türk [after pen]
2014: Yenicami Ağdelen''' 3-1 Lefke [after extra time]

Performance by club
 9 Çetinkaya Türk Spor Kulübü
 4 Gönyeli Spor Kulübü
 3 Baf Ülkü Yurdu
 3 Türk Ocagi Limassol
 3 Magusa Türk Gücü
 2 Yenicami Ağdelen
 1 Küçük Kaymakli Türk Spor Kulübü
 1 Yalova Türk Spor Kulübü
 1 Gençlik Gücü

References

External links
List of cup finals – RSSSF

Supercup
Turkish Republic of Northern Cyprus
Recurring sporting events established in 1981
1981 establishments in Cyprus